State Route 47 (SR 47) is an  arc-shaped state highway that travels through portions of Taliaferro, Wilkes, Lincoln, Columbia, McDuffie, and Jefferson counties in the east-central part of the U.S. state of Georgia. The highway connects Crawfordville and Wrens, via Washington, Lincolnton, and Harlem.

Route description
SR 47 begins at an intersection with US 278/SR 12 (Broad Street) in Crawfordville, within Taliaferro County. It head east-northeast to the town of Sharon, where it meets the northern terminus of SR 269 (Barnett Road SE). At this intersection, SR 47 turns to head to the north-northeast. It travels through rural areas of the county and crosses into Wilkes County. A few miles farther is a bridge over the Little River. The highway continues to the north-northeast and enters Washington. It intersects US 78 Business/SR 10 Business (Robert Toombs Avenue). The three routes head concurrently to the east. At an intersection with Poplar Drive, SR 17 Business joins the concurrency and all four head southeast. They intersect US 78/SR 10/SR 17 (Thomson Road), as well as US 378. At this intersection, all of the business routes end, US 378 begins, and SR 47 heads concurrent along US 378. Less than  later, US 378/SR 47 meet the northern terminus of SR 47 Connector (Thomson Road). Then, they travel through rural areas of the county before crossing into Lincoln County. In Lincolnton, they intersect SR 43. At this intersection, US 378/SR 43 head north-northeast on Washington Street, while SR 43/SR 47 head east on Elm Avenue. Just over  later, SR 43 splits off to the southeast, while SR 47 continues to the east. It curves to the southeast and intersects SR 220 before crossing over Little on the Price–Legg Bridge and entering Columbia County. At the county line, it takes on the Washington Road name. After a southerly jog, they continue to the southeast, skirting along the western edge of Pointes West Army Resort. Then, they cross over Kegg Creek on the Major Byron S. McGuire Sr. Memorial Bridge, just before skirting along the southwestern edge of Wildwood Park. Just over  later, the roadway enters Pollards Corner. There, they intersect with US 221/SR 104/SR 150, SR 47 splits off to travel concurrent with US 221 south, while SR 150 splits off to travel concurrent with US 221 north. Just before entering Appling, the two roads curve to the south. They pass through Appling and meet the western terminus of SR 232 (Columbia Road). Farther to the south is an interchange with Interstate 20 (I-20, Carl Sanders Highway) and an intersection with SR 223 (Wrightsboro Road). The highway continues to the south and intersects US 78/US 278/SR 10 (Milledgeville Road) in Harlem. They curve to the south-southwest before entering McDuffie County. The concurrency begins to parallel the western edges of Fort Gordon and curve to the southwest. They pass through rural areas of the county, and curve back to the south-southwest, before entering Jefferson County. After leaving the Fort Gordon area they continue in a mostly southern routing and enter Wrens. On the northeastern edge of town, they intersect US 1/SR 4/SR 540 (North Main Street/Fall Line Freeway). At this intersection, SR 47 ends and US 221 turns to the right to follow US 1/SR 4/SR 540 into the main part of town.

History

1920s
SR 47 was established at least as early as 1919 on a path from Harlem to Lincolnton, via Appling. Part of SR 10 was established on the current Washington-to-Lincolnton segment. By the end of 1926, from just north of Harlem to just south of the Lincoln–Columbia county line, SR 47 had a "sand clay or top soil" surface. At this time, the portion of SR 10 between Washington and Lincolnton was shifted southward. Its former path between the two cities was redesignated as a westward extension of SR 47. All of this extension, except for the westernmost part, also had a sand clay or top soil surface. By the end of 1929, the entire Harlem–Appling and Appling–Lincolnton segments, except for the easternmost part of both segments, had a completed semi hard surface.

1930s
In 1930, the Lincoln County portion of the Appling–Lincolnton segment was under construction. A portion in the vicinity of Washington had a sand clay or top soil surface. In January 1932, SR 47 was extended southwest on a direct path to Crawfordville. The next year, the entire Washington–Lincolnton segment, except for the easternmost part, was under construction. In mid-1934, the path between Crawfordville and Washington was shifted to a more eastern curve. Near the end of 1936, a small portion of the highway southeast of Lincolnton had a completed hard surface. In 1937, the Harlem–Appling segment, as well as the Wilkes County portion of the Crawfordville–Washington segment, was under construction. Later that year, SR 47 was extended south and then southeast to US 1/SR 4 south-southeast of Harlem at a point that is currently in the southwest part of Fort Gordon. Also, a small portion south of the Lincoln–Columbia county line had a completed hard surface. The next year, the Lincoln County portion of the Washington–Lincolnton segment had a completed hard surface. By mid-1939, the McDuffie County portion of the Harlem extension had completed grading, but was not surfaced; while the Columbia County portion was under construction. Also, the segment from Leah to Lincolnton had a completed hard surface. A few months later, the Wilkes County portion of the Washington–Lincolnton segment had a completed hard surface. At the end of the year, the Harlem extension was under construction.

1940s
By the end of 1941, a small portion of SR 47 north-northeast of the Wilkes–Taliaferro county line was under construction. In 1944, this portion had a sand clay or top soil surface. By the end of 1946, Fort Gordon was established. Because of this, SR 47 was truncated south-southwest of Harlem. The entire highway from Washington to Harlem had a completed hard surface. Between 1946 and 1948, the entire Crawfordville–Washington segment (except for its eastern part) had a sand clay or top soil surface. The eastern part had completed grading, but was not surfaced. The next year, the Columbia County portion of the Harlem extension, as well as the entire Taliaferro County portion, had a completed hard surface.

1950s
By the middle of 1950, the Wilkes County portion of the Crawfordville–Washington segment had a completed hard surface. By the end of 1951, SR 47 was extended south-southwest around the southwest corner of Fort Gordon into the eastern part of Wrens. The western part of this extension had a completed hard surface, while the eastern part had completed grading, but was not surfaced. The next year, the path from Crawfordville to Washington was shifted west to a more direct routing. In 1953, US 378 was designated on the Lincolnton–Washington segment. The western segment was reverted to its eastern curve. The next year, US 221 was designated on the Wrens–Phinizy segment. A few years later, US 221 was shifted off of SR 47 just north of Appling, concurrent with SR 304.

1980s
In 1987, SR 47 was shifted east to once again travel concurrent with US 221 from just north of Appling to Pollards Corner. Because of this, SR 304 was decommissioned.

Major intersections

Bannered route

State Route 47 Connector (SR 47 Conn.) is a  connector route located completely within the central part of Wilkes County in the east-central part of the U.S. state of Georgia. Its entire length is just southeast of Washington. It is known as Thomson Road for its entire length.

It begins at an intersection with US 78/SR 10/SR 17 (Thomson Road), where the roadway continues as Denard Road. The highway travels to the northeast to meet its northern terminus, an intersection with US 378/SR 47 (Lincolnton Road).

See also

References

External links

 Georgia Roads (Routes 41 - 60)
 Georgia State Route 47 on State-Ends.com

047
Transportation in Jefferson County, Georgia
Transportation in McDuffie County, Georgia
Transportation in Columbia County, Georgia
Transportation in Lincoln County, Georgia
Transportation in Wilkes County, Georgia
Transportation in Taliaferro County, Georgia